The 2005–06 Chicago Blackhawks season was the 80th season for the National Hockey League franchise that was established on September 25, 1926.

Off season
Defenseman Adrian Aucoin was named team captain.

Regular season
The Blackhawks struggled on the power play during the regular season, finishing 30th overall in power-play goals scored, with 51, and 30th overall in power-play percentage, at 12.23% (51 for 417).

Final standings

Schedule and results

|- align="center" bgcolor="#FFBBBB"
|1||L||October 5, 2005||3–5 || align="left"|  Mighty Ducks of Anaheim (2005–06) ||0–1–0 || 
|- align="center" bgcolor="#CCFFCC" 
|2||W||October 7, 2005||6–3 || align="left"|  San Jose Sharks (2005–06) ||1–1–0 || 
|- align="center" bgcolor="#FFBBBB"
|3||L||October 9, 2005||2–3 || align="left"|  Columbus Blue Jackets (2005–06) ||1–2–0 || 
|- align="center" bgcolor="#FFBBBB"
|4||L||October 11, 2005||1–4 || align="left"| @ St. Louis Blues (2005–06) ||1–3–0 || 
|- align="center" bgcolor="#CCFFCC" 
|5||W||October 14, 2005||3–2 SO|| align="left"| @ Colorado Avalanche (2005–06) ||2–3–0 || 
|- align="center" bgcolor="#FFBBBB"
|6||L||October 15, 2005||3–4 || align="left"| @ San Jose Sharks (2005–06) ||2–4–0 || 
|- align="center" bgcolor="#FFBBBB"
|7||L||October 18, 2005||2–6 || align="left"| @ Vancouver Canucks (2005–06) ||2–5–0 || 
|- align="center" bgcolor="#CCFFCC" 
|8||W||October 23, 2005||4–2 || align="left"|  Minnesota Wild (2005–06) ||3–5–0 || 
|- align="center" bgcolor="#FFBBBB"
|9||L||October 25, 2005||3–5 || align="left"| @ Nashville Predators (2005–06) ||3–6–0 || 
|- align="center" bgcolor="#FFBBBB"
|10||L||October 27, 2005||2–5 || align="left"| @ Detroit Red Wings (2005–06) ||3–7–0 || 
|- align="center" bgcolor="#FFBBBB"
|11||L||October 29, 2005||2–4 || align="left"|  Detroit Red Wings (2005–06) ||3–8–0 || 
|-

|- align="center" bgcolor="#FFBBBB"
|12||L||November 1, 2005||1–4 || align="left"| @ Detroit Red Wings (2005–06) ||3–9–0 || 
|- align="center" bgcolor="#CCFFCC" 
|13||W||November 2, 2005||6–5 OT|| align="left"| @ St. Louis Blues (2005–06) ||4–9–0 || 
|- align="center" bgcolor="#FFBBBB"
|14||L||November 4, 2005||1–9 || align="left"| @ Dallas Stars (2005–06) ||4–10–0 || 
|- align="center" bgcolor="#CCFFCC" 
|15||W||November 6, 2005||2–1 OT|| align="left"|  Phoenix Coyotes (2005–06) ||5–10–0 || 
|- align="center" bgcolor="#CCFFCC" 
|16||W||November 10, 2005||4–2 || align="left"| @ St. Louis Blues (2005–06) ||6–10–0 || 
|- align="center" bgcolor="#FFBBBB"
|17||L||November 11, 2005||2–4 || align="left"|  Los Angeles Kings (2005–06) ||6–11–0 || 
|- align="center" bgcolor="#CCFFCC" 
|18||W||November 13, 2005||3–1 || align="left"|  Edmonton Oilers (2005–06) ||7–11–0 || 
|- align="center" bgcolor="#CCFFCC" 
|19||W||November 18, 2005||5–2 || align="left"| @ Calgary Flames (2005–06) ||8–11–0 || 
|- align="center" bgcolor="#CCFFCC" 
|20||W||November 19, 2005||4–3 || align="left"| @ Edmonton Oilers (2005–06) ||9–11–0 || 
|- align="center" bgcolor="#FFBBBB"
|21||L||November 22, 2005||1–3 || align="left"| @ Vancouver Canucks (2005–06) ||9–12–0 || 
|- align="center" bgcolor="#FFBBBB"
|22||L||November 26, 2005||2–3 || align="left"| @ Los Angeles Kings (2005–06) ||9–13–0 || 
|- align="center" bgcolor="#FFBBBB"
|23||L||November 27, 2005||1–3 || align="left"| @ Mighty Ducks of Anaheim (2005–06) ||9–14–0 || 
|- align="center" bgcolor="#CCFFCC" 
|24||W||November 30, 2005||3–2 || align="left"|  Los Angeles Kings (2005–06) ||10–14–0 || 
|-

|- align="center" 
|25||L||December 2, 2005||2–3 SO|| align="left"| @ Tampa Bay Lightning (2005–06) ||10–14–1 || 
|- align="center" 
|26||L||December 3, 2005||3–4 OT|| align="left"| @ Florida Panthers (2005–06) ||10–14–2 || 
|- align="center" bgcolor="#CCFFCC" 
|27||W||December 7, 2005||2–1 OT|| align="left"|  New York Rangers (2005–06) ||11–14–2 || 
|- align="center" bgcolor="#CCFFCC" 
|28||W||December 11, 2005||5–4 SO|| align="left"| @ Atlanta Thrashers (2005–06) ||12–14–2 || 
|- align="center" bgcolor="#FFBBBB"
|29||L||December 13, 2005||3–5 || align="left"| @ Carolina Hurricanes (2005–06) ||12–15–2 || 
|- align="center" bgcolor="#FFBBBB"
|30||L||December 15, 2005||3–5 || align="left"| @ Nashville Predators (2005–06) ||12–16–2 || 
|- align="center" bgcolor="#CCFFCC" 
|31||W||December 16, 2005||5–1 || align="left"|  St. Louis Blues (2005–06) ||13–16–2 || 
|- align="center" bgcolor="#FFBBBB"
|32||L||December 18, 2005||3–5 || align="left"|  Dallas Stars (2005–06) ||13–17–2 || 
|- align="center" bgcolor="#FFBBBB"
|33||L||December 21, 2005||1–6 || align="left"|  Nashville Predators (2005–06) ||13–18–2 || 
|- align="center" 
|34||L||December 23, 2005||2–3 OT|| align="left"|  Detroit Red Wings (2005–06) ||13–18–3 || 
|- align="center" 
|35||L||December 26, 2005||3–4 OT|| align="left"| @ Columbus Blue Jackets (2005–06) ||13–18–4 || 
|- align="center" bgcolor="#FFBBBB"
|36||L||December 28, 2005||1–2 || align="left"|  St. Louis Blues (2005–06) ||13–19–4 || 
|- align="center" bgcolor="#FFBBBB"
|37||L||December 30, 2005||2–3 || align="left"|  Columbus Blue Jackets (2005–06) ||13–20–4 || 
|-

|- align="center" bgcolor="#FFBBBB"
|38||L||January 2, 2006||2–3 || align="left"| @ Calgary Flames (2005–06) ||13–21–4 || 
|- align="center" bgcolor="#FFBBBB"
|39||L||January 3, 2006||0–5 || align="left"| @ Edmonton Oilers (2005–06) ||13–22–4 || 
|- align="center" bgcolor="#FFBBBB"
|40||L||January 5, 2006||2–3 || align="left"|  Vancouver Canucks (2005–06) ||13–23–4 || 
|- align="center" bgcolor="#FFBBBB"
|41||L||January 8, 2006||1–5 || align="left"|  Nashville Predators (2005–06) ||13–24–4 || 
|- align="center" bgcolor="#CCFFCC" 
|42||W||January 10, 2006||4–3 OT|| align="left"| @ Washington Capitals (2005–06) ||14–24–4 || 
|- align="center" bgcolor="#FFBBBB"
|43||L||January 11, 2006||2–5 || align="left"|  Philadelphia Flyers (2005–06) ||14–25–4 || 
|- align="center" bgcolor="#CCFFCC" 
|44||W||January 13, 2006||4–1 || align="left"|  Pittsburgh Penguins (2005–06) ||15–25–4 || 
|- align="center"
|45||L||January 15, 2006||2–3 SO|| align="left"|  New Jersey Devils (2005–06) ||15–25–5 || 
|- align="center" 
|46||L||January 17, 2006||1–2 OT|| align="left"|  New York Islanders (2005–06) ||15–25–6 || 
|- align="center" bgcolor="#CCFFCC" 
|47||W||January 19, 2006||4–2 || align="left"|  Colorado Avalanche (2005–06) ||16–25–6 || 
|- align="center" bgcolor="#FFBBBB"
|48||L||January 20, 2006||1–4 || align="left"| @ Minnesota Wild (2005–06) ||16–26–6 || 
|- align="center" bgcolor="#FFBBBB"
|49||L||January 22, 2006||2–3 || align="left"|  Minnesota Wild (2005–06) ||16–27–6 || 
|- align="center" bgcolor="#CCFFCC" 
|50||W||January 26, 2006||2–0 || align="left"|  Calgary Flames (2005–06) ||17–27–6 || 
|- align="center" bgcolor="#FFBBBB"
|51||L||January 29, 2006||3–5 || align="left"|  Calgary Flames (2005–06) ||17–28–6 || 
|-

|- align="center" 
|52||L||February 2, 2006||5–6 SO|| align="left"| @ St. Louis Blues (2005–06) ||17–28–7 || 
|- align="center" bgcolor="#FFBBBB"
|53||L||February 4, 2006||0–6 || align="left"| @ Nashville Predators (2005–06) ||17–29–7 || 
|- align="center" bgcolor="#CCFFCC" 
|54||W||February 7, 2006||3–1 || align="left"| @ Phoenix Coyotes (2005–06) ||18–29–7 || 
|- align="center" bgcolor="#FFBBBB"
|55||L||February 8, 2006||1–2 || align="left"| @ San Jose Sharks (2005–06) ||18–30–7 || 
|- align="center" 
|56||L||February 11, 2006||4–5 OT|| align="left"| @ Los Angeles Kings (2005–06) ||18–30–8 || 
|- align="center" bgcolor="#FFBBBB"
|57||L||February 12, 2006||1–4 || align="left"| @ Mighty Ducks of Anaheim (2005–06) ||18–31–8 || 
|-

|- align="center" bgcolor="#CCFFCC" 
|58||W||March 1, 2006||3–0 || align="left"|  Nashville Predators (2005–06) ||19–31–8 || 
|- align="center" 
|59||L||March 3, 2006||4–5 SO|| align="left"|  Vancouver Canucks (2005–06) ||19–31–9 || 
|- align="center" bgcolor="#FFBBBB"
|60||L||March 5, 2006||2–7 || align="left"|  Dallas Stars (2005–06) ||19–32–9 || 
|- align="center" bgcolor="#CCFFCC" 
|61||W||March 7, 2006||3–1 || align="left"| @ Columbus Blue Jackets (2005–06) ||20–32–9 || 
|- align="center" bgcolor="#FFBBBB"
|62||L||March 9, 2006||1–2 || align="left"|  Colorado Avalanche (2005–06) ||20–33–9 || 
|- align="center" bgcolor="#FFBBBB"
|63||L||March 11, 2006||4–6 || align="left"| @ Detroit Red Wings (2005–06) ||20–34–9 || 
|- align="center" bgcolor="#FFBBBB"
|64||L||March 12, 2006||3–5 || align="left"|  Detroit Red Wings (2005–06) ||20–35–9 || 
|- align="center" bgcolor="#CCFFCC" 
|65||W||March 15, 2006||3–2 || align="left"|  Columbus Blue Jackets (2005–06) ||21–35–9 || 
|- align="center" bgcolor="#FFBBBB"
|66||L||March 17, 2006||1–2 || align="left"|  Mighty Ducks of Anaheim (2005–06) ||21–36–9 || 
|- align="center" bgcolor="#FFBBBB"
|67||L||March 19, 2006||2–3 || align="left"|  Phoenix Coyotes (2005–06) ||21–37–9 || 
|- align="center" bgcolor="#FFBBBB"
|68||L||March 23, 2006||3–4 || align="left"| @ Phoenix Coyotes (2005–06) ||21–38–9 || 
|- align="center" 
|69||L||March 24, 2006||2–3 SO|| align="left"| @ Dallas Stars (2005–06) ||21–38–10 || 
|- align="center" 
|70||L||March 26, 2006||4–5 OT|| align="left"|  San Jose Sharks (2005–06) ||21–38–11 || 
|- align="center" bgcolor="#CCFFCC" 
|71||W||March 29, 2006||3–2 OT|| align="left"|  St. Louis Blues (2005–06) ||22–38–11 || 
|- align="center" bgcolor="#CCFFCC" 
|72||W||March 31, 2006||3–2 OT|| align="left"| @ Detroit Red Wings (2005–06) ||23–38–11 || 
|-

|- align="center" bgcolor="#FFBBBB"
|73||L||April 1, 2006||2–5 || align="left"| @ Columbus Blue Jackets (2005–06) ||23–39–11 || 
|- align="center" bgcolor="#FFBBBB"
|74||L||April 3, 2006||3–4 || align="left"| @ Colorado Avalanche (2005–06) ||23–40–11 || 
|- align="center" bgcolor="#CCFFCC" 
|75||W||April 5, 2006||4–3 || align="left"|  Nashville Predators (2005–06) ||24–40–11 || 
|- align="center" 
|76||L||April 7, 2006||3–4 OT|| align="left"|  Edmonton Oilers (2005–06) ||24–40–12 || 
|- align="center" 
|77||L||April 8, 2006||1–2 SO|| align="left"| @ Nashville Predators (2005–06) ||24–40–13 || 
|- align="center" bgcolor="#FFBBBB"
|78||L||April 11, 2006||0–2 || align="left"| @ Minnesota Wild (2005–06) ||24–41–13 || 
|- align="center" bgcolor="#FFBBBB"
|79||L||April 13, 2006||3–7 || align="left"|  Detroit Red Wings (2005–06) ||24–42–13 || 
|- align="center" bgcolor="#FFBBBB"
|80||L||April 15, 2006||2–5 || align="left"| @ Columbus Blue Jackets (2005–06) ||24–43–13 || 
|- align="center" bgcolor="#CCFFCC" 
|81||W||April 16, 2006||4–3 || align="left"|  Columbus Blue Jackets (2005–06) ||25–43–13 || 
|- align="center" bgcolor="#CCFFCC" 
|82||W||April 18, 2006||3–2 OT|| align="left"|  St. Louis Blues (2005–06) ||26–43–13 || 
|-

|-
| Legend:

Player statistics

Scoring
 Position abbreviations: C = Center; D = Defense; G = Goaltender; LW = Left Wing; RW = Right Wing
  = Joined team via a transaction (e.g., trade, waivers, signing) during the season. Stats reflect time with the Blackhawks only.
  = Left team via a transaction (e.g., trade, waivers, release) during the season. Stats reflect time with the Blackhawks only.

Goaltending
  = Joined team via a transaction (e.g., trade, waivers, signing) during the season. Stats reflect time with the Blackhawks only.
  = Left team via a transaction (e.g., trade, waivers, release) during the season. Stats reflect time with the Blackhawks only.

Awards and records

Milestones

Transactions
The Blackhawks were involved in the following transactions from February 17, 2005, the day after the 2004–05 NHL season was officially cancelled, through June 19, 2006, the day of the deciding game of the 2006 Stanley Cup Finals.

Trades

Players acquired

Players lost

Signings

Draft picks
Chicago's draft picks at the 2005 NHL Entry Draft held at the Westin Hotel in Ottawa, Ontario.

See also
2005–06 NHL season

Notes

References

Chic
Chic
Chicago Blackhawks seasons
Chic
Chic